The Kansas Jayhawks football program is the intercollegiate football program of the University of Kansas. The program is classified in the National Collegiate Athletic Association (NCAA) Division I Bowl Subdivision (FBS), and the team competes in the Big 12 Conference. The Jayhawks are led by head coach Lance Leipold.

The program's first season was 1890, making it one of the oldest college football programs, and the oldest team in the state of Kansas. The team's home field is David Booth Kansas Memorial Stadium, which opened in 1921 and is one of the oldest college football stadiums in the nation. Until 2014, Memorial Stadium was one of the few football stadiums in Division I that had a track encircling the field. The track was removed in 2014, as the University's newly built Rock Chalk Park sports complex opened for use by the school's outdoor track and field team. In 2019, immediately adjacent to the west of the stadium, the University of Kansas Football Indoor Practice Facility was completed. The facility was built using only private donations from University of Kansas alumni, most notably David Booth.  KU's all-time record was 589–658–58 as of the conclusion of the 2020 season. The program saw a re-emergence under head coach Mark Mangino who won 50 games in eight seasons. From the departure of Mangino to 2021, the Jayhawks struggled to meet the same success as under Mangino. The program's overall record in that time frame was 22–111 (.165 win percentage). They also never won more than 3 games and never more than a single conference win during that time frame. They also had two winless seasons and five losing streaks of 10 or more games. The Jayhawks also lost 46 straight road games from the final year under Mangino to 2018 and 56 straight road conference games which spanned from 2009 to 2021. The Jayhawks had an active streak of 44 consecutive losses to teams ranked in the AP poll that has stood since a loss to 24th ranked Oklahoma in 2009. This lasted until the 2022 Season when they beat 18th Oklahoma State 37–16. Kansas became bowl eligible for the first time since the 2008 season.  

While Kansas has yet to have a Heisman Trophy winner, they have had one Heisman finalist and 2 other players receive votes. John Hadl, Bobby Douglass, and David Jaynes all received votes, Jaynes being the only finalist. Other notable former Kansas players include Pro Football Hall of Famers Gale Sayers, John Riggins, and Mike McCormack, as well as All-Americans Nolan Cromwell, Dana Stubblefield, Aqib Talib, and Anthony Collins. Additionally, two members of the Naismith Memorial Basketball Hall of Fame have been associated with Kansas Football: Phog Allen, who coached football at Kansas for a season in 1920, and Ralph Miller, who was a quarterback on the team from 1937–1940. Jim Bausch, who won gold in the decathlon at the 1932 Summer Olympics, was a running back at Kansas and was inducted into the College Football Hall of Fame. Kansas has appeared in twelve bowl games, including three trips to the Orange Bowl (1948, 1969, and 2008). Kansas has also won six conference championships, most recently winning one in 1968. Kansas played in the first NCAA-contracted nationally televised regular season college football game on September 20, 1952, against TCU.

Along with Iowa, Missouri, Nebraska, and Washington University in St. Louis, Kansas was a charter member of the Missouri Valley Intercollegiate Athletic Association in 1907, which evolved into the Big Eight Conference. The Big Eight was folded into the Big 12 in 1996, and Kansas is the only original member of the MVIAA that is still part of the Big 12.

History

The Jayhawks are one of the oldest football programs in the country, being founded in 1890. The most successful era for Kansas football was 1890 to 1952, when the program recorded four undefeated seasons and posted an overall  winning percentage, over 300 wins, several conference championships, and made major bowl appearances. From 1953 to 1968, the Jayhawks continued to find success on the football field, sharing three conference titles and attending more bowl games, but the team's overall winning percentage during that era slipped.

The losing accelerated during the years 2010 to 2020, during which the team posted a 21–108 record ( winning percentage), including two of the three winless seasons in the program's history. During the 2012 season, the program's all-time winning percentage fell below .500 for the first time since KU finished 1–2 in 1890.

Early history (1890–1947)

The University of Kansas fielded its first football team in 1890, led by player-coach Will Coleman.  Kansas traveled to nearby Baker University to play the first college football game in Kansas to start that season.  After playing an abbreviated three-game season in 1890, KU played its first full schedule in 1891 and immediately found success, posting a 7–0–1 record under head coach E. M. Hopkins.  The 1891 season also featured the school's first football game against the University of Missouri, the first game in what would become the long-running Border War rivalry, a 22–8 KU victory in Kansas City.

In 1899, Hall-of-Famer Fielding H. Yost served one season as KU's football coach, posting the first perfect season in school history (10–0).  After the turn of the century, Hall-of-Famer John Outland, who played at KU in 1895–1896, returned to Kansas to serve as head coach, but struggled to a 3–5–2 record in his only season in 1901.  The 1902 season featured the program's first game of its rivalry against Kansas State, a 16–0 Jayhawk win.

The program had ten head coaches in its first 14 seasons, but A. R. Kennedy took the position in 1904 and held it for the next seven highly successful seasons, through 1910. Kennedy's overall coaching record at Kansas was 52–9–4.  This still ranks as the most wins for any Kansas head coach, and puts him fourth at the school in terms of winning percentage. Kennedy's best season was 1908, when the Jayhawks posted the school's second ever undefeated season (9–0) and won the school's first major conference championship, in the Missouri Valley Intercollegiate Athletic Association.  KU has not had another perfect season since 1908. Kennedy was also one of the best performing coaches for Kansas in the Border War (as of 2007 called "Border Showdown") between Kansas and Missouri, going 4–1–2 (.714) against MU as a coach and 7–1–2 (.800) against MU cumulatively as a coach and player.

Kennedy's long tenure was followed by another period of rapid turnover in coaches, with seven head coaches for KU in the next ten seasons.  The most successful of these was Herman Olcott, who had a three-year tenure as head coach from 1915 to 1917, posting a record of 16–7–1. Basketball coach Phog Allen also served one year as head football coach during this era, with a record of 5–2–1 in 1920.  Potsy Clark finally returned some stability to the position, serving as KU's head football coach for five seasons, from 1921 to 1925. Although Clark would later go on to find success as an NFL head coach, at KU he amassed a 16–17–6 record in his five seasons and left the school as the first coach with an overall losing record since John Outland in 1901. Football innovator Bill Hargiss – one of the first in the sport to use the huddle and forward pass – was hired as KU head coach in 1928. Hargiss coached the team to a Big Six championship in 1930, but could not sustain success and was fired only two games into the 1932 season, after the Jayhawks lost at home to Oklahoma, 21–6.  Hargiss recorded an overall mark of 18–16–2 as KU head coach. Through the end of Hargiss's tenure in 1932 the Jayhawks football program had registered a great deal of success, with only four of the first twenty coaches at KU suffering losing records. Beginning with Hargiss's successor Adrian Lindsey's 23–30–8 mark at KU, four of the next seven coaches at KU would post losing records.

KU alum Adrian Lindsey was hired by his alma mater as head football coach in the middle of the 1932 season, taking over after the mid-season firing of Bill Hargiss.  Lindsey led the Jayhawks to a 4–2 record during his first partial season.  Lindsey's teams thereafter struggled to find success on the football field, posting an overall record of 23–30–8 during Lindsey's time as head coach. Lindsey was replaced after the 1938 season. In 1939, Gwinn Henry, formerly head coach of the rival Missouri Tigers from 1923 to 1931, was hired to take over the struggling Jayhawks football program.  In four seasons at KU, Henry failed to find much success on the field, going a dismal 9–27 – the worst record of any KU head coach to that time. Because of the struggles, Henry was fired after the 1942 season. Henry Shenk was hired to replace Gwinn Henry but failed to turn around the Jayhawks football program, which by this time had fallen to the bottom of the Big Six Conference. Shenk's teams fared better than his predecessors, but failed to post a winning record in any of his three seasons. Shenk's final record at KU was 11–16–3.

Though he was KU's head coach for only two years, George Sauer had an immediate impact on the program and was the most successful Jayhawks coach since A. R. Kennedy. Both of his KU teams won a share of the Big Six Conference, posting records of 7–2–1 and 8–1–2. His 1947 team was invited to KU's first bowl game, the Orange Bowl.  Despite falling 20–14 to Georgia Tech in the bowl game, KU finished the 1947 season ranked No. 12 in the AP Poll – the program's first appearance in a final poll. Sauer departed after his successful 1947 season to accept the head football coach position at Navy. His final record at KU was 15–3–3, giving him the highest winning percentage of any KU coach since A. R. Kennedy. He was inducted into the College Football Hall of Fame as a player in 1954.

Jules Sikes came to Kansas from his post as defensive line coach at Georgia. Sikes had success at KU, in particular 7–3 seasons in 1948 and 1952, 6–4 in 1950 and 8–2 in 1951 that included a No. 20 ranking in the final Coaches' Poll. Despite several winning years, a 2–8 season in 1953 sealed his fate as head coach. He was fired after the dismal season. His final record with the Jayhawks was 35–25.

Mid-century
Chuck Mather was hired in 1954 as the 27th head football coach for the Kansas Jayhawks. He started his tenure with an 0–10 season in 1954, the first winless season in KU history. Mather continued to struggle at KU, leaving after the 1957 season with an overall coaching record at Kansas of 11–26–3, ranking him 18th at Kansas in terms of total wins and 34th in terms of winning percentage.

Jack Mitchell left Arkansas and came to the Jayhawks to replace Mather in 1958. His overall coaching record at Kansas was 44–42–5 in nine seasons. This ranks him fourth at Kansas in terms of total wins and 20th at Kansas in terms of winning percentage. Mitchell's teams made one bowl appearance at KU, the 1961 Bluebonnet Bowl, a game KU won. That year, the Jayhawks finished the season with a 7–3–1 record and a No. 15 ranking in the final Coaches' poll. Mitchell's 1960 team also was successful. That year, the Jayhawks finished 7–2–1 and had a final ranking of No. 9 and No. 11 in the final Coaches' and AP polls, respectively. When Mitchell retired from coaching after the 1966 season he was viewed by many as the savior of the Jayhawk football program.

UCLA assistant coach Pepper Rodgers was chosen as the head football coach after Mitchell's retirement. Rodgers led the Jayhawks to the Big Eight Conference title in 1968, the Jayhawks' most recent conference championship. That year, the Jayhawks finished the season with a 9–2 record, an Orange Bowl appearance (a 15–14 loss to Penn State) and final rankings of No. 6 and No. 7 in the final Coaches' and AP polls, respectively. Rodgers finished his tenure as KU head football coach with a 20–22 overall record in four seasons. He resigned after the 1970 season to accept the head football coach position at the school from which he came to KU, UCLA.

1970-1989

A longtime Kansas assistant coach, Don Fambrough was elevated to head coach after the departure of Pepper Rodgers. During his first stint as head coach, Fambrough's only winning season was in 1973, when the Jayhawks finished the season 7–4–1 and made an appearance in the Liberty Bowl, a game they lost. That year, Kansas finished the season ranked No. 15 and No. 18 in the Coaches' and AP polls, respectively. However, when Kansas regressed to 4–7 in 1974 and the administration refused to renew his contract, Fambrough resigned.

Fambrough returned as head coach in 1979, and his second tenure as head coach is best known for the Jayhawks' 1981 season, that ended with an 8–4 record and an appearance in the All-American Bowl which, like many bowl games before it, resulted in a loss for the Jayhawks. Fambrough was fired after the 1982 season. His second tenure produced an 18–23–4 record, giving him an overall record of 37–48–5 in eight seasons at KU.  In 1983, Kansas was found guilty of numerous recruiting violations, principally involving one of Fambrough's assistants.  As a result, Kansas was banned from postseason play and live television in 1983.  Fambrough was cleared of wrongdoing, but the assistant was slapped with a three-year show-cause penalty, which effectively blackballed him from the collegiate ranks until 1986.

Kansas hired Bud Moore, previously Alabama offensive coordinator under Bear Bryant, to replace Fambrough after his first exit from the Jayhawks. In his first season in 1975, Moore was named Big Eight Coach of the Year and was runner up to Woody Hayes as the Football Writers Association of America National Coach of the Year. Moore led his team to a 23–3 upset over eventual national champion Oklahoma, breaking the Sooners' 37-game winning streak. After thrashing Missouri the Jayhawks received a bid to the Sun Bowl, losing to Pitt (who would win the national championship in 1976), giving the Hawks a final record of 7–5.

In 1976, the Jayhawks started 4-0 and were ranked 8th in the AP poll (the last time they would be ranked in 17 years), but after QB Nolan Cromwell suffered a season-ending knee injury against Oklahoma, KU finished 6–5. Moore was the first KU coach with back-to-back winning seasons since Jack Mitchell in 1961–62, but this success was followed by 4–6–1 in 1977 and then 1–10 in 1978. In spite of dominating rivals Missouri and Kansas State, these struggles, failure to improve facilities, plus lagging attendance, led to Moore's firing as head coach after four seasons. In 1983, KU hired Mike Gottfried away from Cincinnati to replace the Fambrough. Gottfried had a mediocre tenure as the Jayhawks head coach, making modest improvement each season, with records of 4–6–1, 5–6 and 6–6. His final record at KU was 15–18–1.

Gottfried departed Kansas after three seasons to accept the head football coach position at Pittsburgh.  He was succeeded by offensive coordinator Bob Valesente. During Valesente's two seasons as head coach, the Jayhawks compiled a record of 4–17–1 overall, and 0–13–1 against Big Eight opponents – finishing with a winning percentage of .205, the worst in school history to that time (since surpassed by Charlie Weis, David Beaty, and Clint Bowen).  The Jayhawks went 1–9–1 in 1987 with their only win being a 16–15 game against Southern Illinois.  Valesente was fired at the end of the season.  At the time of his firing, Valesente was in the second year of a four-year contract, which athletic director Bob Frederick said would be honored.  Valesente told reporters, "I don't believe two years is enough to build a program. I just don't feel we've been given enough time."  Valesente had undertaken efforts to improve the team's academic standing and noted, "I feel proud of the fact that we have begun to overcome some of the immense academic problems that have plagued us. We needed to first stop the academic attrition." Anthony Redwood, the chairman of the Kansas Athletic Corporation board and a business professor, resigned from the board in protest of the firing.  Redwood noted, "Apparently we lack the courage at this institution to plan a course of action and stick with it. Certainly to the outside world this decision must call into question our commitment to the academic dimension of intercollegiate athletics."

Glen Mason era (1988–1995)
KU hired Glen Mason away from Kent State to take over the Jayhawks football program in late 1987. Mason restored promise into KU's football program, with four winning seasons in his nine seasons and two bowl victories, the 1992 and 1995 Aloha Bowl, defeating BYU and UCLA, respectively. These were the first KU bowl victories since the 1961 Bluebonnet Bowl. Those years, the Jayhawks finished 8–4 and 10–2, the latter of which tied a school record for victories in a single season, previously set in 1899.

In 1995, as Kansas prepared for the Aloha Bowl against UCLA, Mason accepted the head coaching position at Georgia.  Mason had a change of heart and stayed with the Jayhawks, but left for the Minnesota one season later. His final record at Kansas was 47–54–1.

First Decline
Coach Terry Allen came to KU from Northern Iowa after the departure of Glen Mason. Despite increased optimism from the fans and administration due to the successes of the previous coaching staff, Allen's teams continued the KU football tradition of struggling on the playing field, failing to compile a winning season in five years and finishing 21–35 in that span of time.

Allen was fired with two games left in his fifth season at Kansas. His best season was a 5–6 record his first year.

Mark Mangino era (2002–2009)

The Jayhawks hired Mark Mangino, previously offensive coordinator at Oklahoma, as the new KU head coach in late 2001. The program had not posted a winning season in any of the 6 seasons prior to his arrival. While an intense, foul-mouthed and fiery coach, Mangino was able to enjoy success at that previous KU coaches hadn't. In 2003, his second season at KU, Mangino led the Jayhawks to an appearance in the 2003 Tangerine Bowl (now known as the Russell Athletic Bowl). This was the first bowl appearance for Kansas since 1995. In 2005, his fourth season at KU, the team finished the regular season 6–5, to post its first winning record under Mangino, and went on to the Fort Worth Bowl, its second bowl game in three seasons. Among the Jayhawks' wins was a 40–15 victory over Nebraska, breaking a losing streak that had begun in 1969, which was the second-longest streak of consecutive losses to one team in NCAA history. The same year Mangino also built a defense that ranked 11th nationally in yards allowed per game and featured third-team All-American and Big 12 Conference Defensive Player of the Year linebacker Nick Reid as well as a pair of talented cornerbacks in Charles Gordon and Aqib Talib. In 2007, Mangino coached the Jayhawks to a 12–1 record and the 2008 Orange Bowl. The Jayhawks defeated Virginia Tech 24–21 in that game, which gave the Jayhawks their first and only BCS Bowl Game appearance and victory. Mangino's Jayhawk defense was ranked 12th in the nation, and 4th in scoring defense. On the other side of the ball, the Jayhawks finished 2nd in scoring offense led by Quarterback Todd Reesing

Following a win against rival Iowa State, Mark Mangino became the first KU football coach with a winning career record since Jack Mitchell in 1966. While at Kansas, Mangino led the Jayhawks to 19 consecutive weeks ranked in the AP and/or USA Today polls (2007–08), 20  wins in a 2-year period for the first time in school history, set home attendance average records in each of the last 4 seasons (2004–2008), led KU to its first appearance in national polls since 1996 and to the school's highest ranking ever at No. 2, and produced the top 3 total offense seasons in school history, the top two passing seasons and two of the top three scoring seasons and won three Bowl games—the same number they had won in their 102-year history combined prior to his arrival. Mangino also led the Jayhawks to victories in the 2005 Fort Worth Bowl and the 2008 Insight Bowl. 

With 50 victories, Mangino has the second-most victories in Kansas coaching history. Mangino was named AFCA Coach of the Year, AP Coach of the Year, Eddie Robinson Coach of the Year, George Munger Award winner, Home Depot Coach of the Year, Paul "Bear" Bryant Coach of the Year, Sporting News College Football Coach of the Year, Walter Camp Coach of the Year, Woody Hayes Coach of the Year and Big 12 Coach of the Year in 2007.

In 2009, the Jayhawks started the season with a 5–0 record (No. 16 in AP poll at the time), but lost their final 7 games to finish at 5–7.  In November 2009, the recurring issue of Mangino's alleged misconduct towards his players became the subject of an internal investigation by the University of Kansas Athletic Department.  National sports media coverage of this increased already-mounting public pressure on the university to terminate Mangino's employment.  After a prolonged period of negotiations, the university and Mangino's attorneys agreed on the buy-out amount that was large enough to secure his quiet resignation as head football coach in December 2009.

Mangino's final record at KU was 50–48. He was the first head football coach to leave the Jayhawks with an overall winning record since Jack Mitchell in 1966.

Second Decline
On December 13, 2009, Turner Gill was hired away from Buffalo and announced as the new head coach of the Kansas football team. He was the first African American head football coach in KU history.  Gill inherited a team that had lost its final 7 games under Mangino.

On September 4, 2010, Gill lost his Kansas home debut to an FCS school (North Dakota State) 6–3. The Jayhawks bounced back the following week to upset No. 15 Georgia Tech 28–25.  The upset was a high point in an otherwise difficult 3–9 season.  The Jayhawks had one conference win in 2010, a 52–45 comeback win over Colorado after trailing 45–17 in the 4th quarter, with Colorado coach Dan Hawkins calling mostly passing plays to pad stats.  It was the final meeting between the teams before Colorado exited the Big 12 for the Pac-12 Conference.

The 2011 Jayhawks started the season at 2–0, but finished on a 10-game losing streak. This included lopsided losses to Georgia Tech (66–24), Oklahoma State (70–28), Oklahoma (47–17), Kansas State (59–21), Texas (43–0), and Texas A&M (61–7). Of 120 teams, the Jayhawks ranked 101st in passing yards, 95th in points scored, 120th in points allowed, 106th in total offense, and were outscored 525–238.

Then-KU athletics director Sheahon Zenger fired Gill after just two seasons with a 5–19 overall record., a 1–16 record against the Big 12, and a 4–18 record against FBS opponents. The university owed Gill nearly $6 million, money that was due in just 120 days. To pay this, the university relied upon donations from Jayhawks boosters. 

Zenger then hired former Notre Dame head coach Charlie Weis, who at the time was serving as offensive coordinator at Florida, as the new Jayhawks head football coach in December 2011. A big-name coach, Weis was popular among KU fans and was expected to lure recruits to KU and rebuild the football program.

Weis' 2012 Jayhawks team struggled to a 1–11 record in what was dubbed as a rebuilding year. During that season, the Jayhawks' all-time record dipped below .500 for the first time since the Jayhawks finished 1–2 in their inaugural season. In 2013, the 3–9 Jayhawks ended a 27-game Big 12 Conference losing streak, which had spanned three years, with a 31–19 home victory over West Virginia in November 2013. Weis was fired on September 28, 2014 for "lack of on-field progress" four games into the 2014 season.  Weis' teams had an overall record of 6–22, a 1–17 record vs. the Big 12, and a 3–22 record against FBS opponents.  Defensive coordinator Clint Bowen was named interim head coach. Bowen posted a 1–7 record as interim coach, the lone victory a conference win over Iowa State.

On December 5, 2014, KU announced the hiring of Texas A&M wide receivers coach David Beaty as the Jayhawks head coach. Former interim head coach Clint Bowen remained at KU on the coaching staff as a co-defensive coordinator and assistant head coach. Beaty concluded his first season (2015) with an 0–12 record, the first winless season for KU football since 1954.  Out of 128 teams, Kansas ranked 124th in scoring, 128th in points allowed, 115th in total offense, and 128th in total defense, and was outscored 554–183.

In the 2016 season opener, Kansas beat FCS school Rhode Island 55–6, securing their first win since November 2014.  On November 19, 2016, Kansas beat the Texas Longhorns in Lawrence 24–21 in overtime – the Jayhawks’ first win over Texas in more than 75 years.

The 2018 season began with a home loss to an FCS opponent in Nicholls State.  However, the Jayhawks bounced back to rout Central Michigan 31–7 in week 2, and Rutgers 55–14 in week 3.  Central Michigan was KU's first road win since September 12, 2009 (Mangino's final season), and snapped a 46-game road losing streak. Kansas got their first Big 12 win of the season against TCU, winning by a score of 27–26.

On November 4, after a home loss to Iowa State, it was announced that Beaty would coach the final three games but would be fired at the end of the season.  Beaty's record was 6–42 over four seasons, with a 2–34 record against the Big 12, and a 4–40 record against FBS opponents.

On November 18, 2018, former Oklahoma State and LSU head coach Les Miles was hired as the new head coach. Miles arrived in Lawrence with credentials including a turnaround in five seasons at Oklahoma State, seven ten-win seasons in 11 years as LSU head coach, including winning the 2007 national championship, and an appearance in the 2012 BCS National Championship Game and many players drafted into the National Football League. Miles signed a five-year contract worth $13.8 million in base salary. His first season ended with a 3–9 record and 1–8 conference record; however, they ended a 48-game losing streak in road games against power five conference opponents with a 48-24 win at Boston College. His second season, which was shortened due to the COVID-19 pandemic, ended with a 0–9 record. Miles was put on administrative leave on March 5, 2021 for allegations of misconduct with female students from his time at LSU. Miles and Kansas would mutually agree to part ways on March 8. Wide receivers coach Emmett Jones was named interim coach three days later.

2021–present 

Lance Leipold was hired to replace Miles on April 30, 2021. The circumstances of the hiring being at the end of Spring caused Leipold to only have one full month of practice with the team before Kansas's first game in September against South Dakota. The Jayhawks would win their first game under Leipold by defeating South Dakota 17–14 on September 4. The win would also be Kansas's first since 2019. On November 13, the Jayhawks ended a 56-game road losing streak in Big 12 play when they earned a 57-56 overtime victory over the Texas Longhorns. Kansas fell to TCU and West Virginia the final two weeks of the season, but each by less than a touchdown. Earlier in the season, the Jayhawks also nearly beat Oklahoma who was 2nd in the AP rankings. They held Oklahoma to zero points in the 1st half, but ultimately lost after a controversial second half handoff play that would seal the win for the Sooners.

At the beginning of Leipold's second season at Kansas, the Jayhawks beat Tennessee Tech 56–10. In week 2 the Jayhawks beat West Virginia 55-42 in Morgantown, winning their first conference opener since 2009, and their first conference road opener since 2008, and becoming the first NCAA team since 1996 to win an overtime game by two touchdowns. After their 3–0 start to the 2022 season, Kansas received votes to be ranked for the first time since 2009. The Jayhawks would enter the polls the following week at 19 after starting 5–0, but would fall out of the rankings after back-to-back losses. The Jayhawks would finish the regular season 6-6 and were selected to play Arkansas in the 2022 Liberty Bowl, KU's first bowl appearance since 2009. Arkansas would go on to beat KU in 3 overtimes, 55–53.

Conference affiliations
Kansas has been affiliated with the following conferences:

Championships

Conference championships
Kansas has won nine conference championships.

† Co-championship

Division championships
The Big 12 had a North and South division from its inaugural season through the 2010 season when Nebraska and Colorado left the conference. In that time frame, the Jayhawks won 1 division title. The conference will expand beginning with the 2023 season which may cause divisions to return, however, the conference hasn't announced their plans for the expansion yet.

† Co-championship

Bowl games
The Jayhawks have participated in 13 bowl games, compiling a 6–7 record through the 2021 season. During the BCS’ 16 seasons of existence, the Jayhawks appeared in one BCS Bowl game, the 2008 Orange Bowl, which they won. The Jayhawks longest amount of time in between bowl games is 13 years, which they've done twice, from 1948 to 1960 and 2009 to 2021.

Rivalries

Missouri

The University of Kansas has a rivalry with the Missouri Tigers.  The rivalry has been dormant since Missouri moved to the Southeastern Conference in 2012. Missouri leads the series 57-54-9

Before being inactive from 2012 to 2019, it was known as the oldest rivalry west of the Mississippi River.  First played in 1891, the Jayhawks and Tigers met on the gridiron every year after through 2011, with the lone exception being 1918 (flu epidemic). The annual game was known as the "Border War," which derived its name from actual warfare that occurred during the Civil War between free-state "Jayhawkers" and pro-slavery "Bushwhackers" from Missouri. Six towns, including Osceola, Missouri, were pillaged and raided by the Jayhawkers. In retaliation, William Quantrill and his band of Bushwhackers burned Lawrence to the ground in what became known as the Lawrence Massacre. Ironically, Columbia, Missouri, the location of the University of Missouri was also nearly raided by Quantrill's band.  The name of the rivalry was officially rebranded as the "Border Showdown" in 2004 out of deference to those serving in the Iraq War, but the historical name continued to prevail in usage.  Each year the winner of the game was awarded a traveling trophy, the Indian War Drum.  Kansas lost the 120th and most recent Border War game to Missouri in 2011, 24–10.

In 1911, more than 1,000 people gathered in downtown Lawrence, Kansas to watch a mechanical reproduction of the game while it was being played.  A Western Union telegraph wire was set up direct from Columbia, Missouri.  A group of people then would announce the results of the previous play and used a large model of a football playing field to show the results.  Those in attendance cheered as though they were watching the game live, including the school's legendary Rock Chalk, Jayhawk cheer.

Kansas State

Kansas has a rivalry with the Kansas State Wildcats called the Sunflower Showdown. When the two teams compete in football, the winner is awarded the Governor's Cup by the governor of Kansas. Despite Kansas State holding a 27–8 record since 1988 in the series, Kansas leads the series 64–51–5. As of 2022, Kansas is on a 14 game losing streak to Kansas State. In the last 19 years KU has only beaten the Wildcats four times. 

The two teams first met in 1902 and have played every year since 1911.  It is the fifth-longest continuous series in NCAA college football history – 112 consecutive seasons after the 2022 game.

Nebraska

The Kansas-Nebraska series was the longest uninterrupted rivalry in college football until Nebraska's departure for the Big Ten Conference in 2011.  Kansas and Nebraska met for the first time in 1892, and faced off annually from 1906 until 2010.  Along with the Missouri rivalry, this gave Kansas the second- and third-most played Division I FBS college football series (Minnesota and Wisconsin have played one more game than KU-MU and two more than KU-NU).  KU is only 23–90–3 all-time against the Cornhuskers (as of the last game in 2010), and from 1969 to 2004 the Huskers rang up 36 consecutive victories, second-longest in NCAA Division I (only Notre Dame's 43-game streak over Navy was longer). That streak ended on November 5, 2005, when Kansas defeated Nebraska 40–15 in Lawrence. They again beat Nebraska 76–39 in Lawrence on November 3, 2007. This was the largest number of points ever surrendered by a Nebraska team; the Jayhawks also set records for most points against Nebraska in a half (1st half, 48 points) and quarter (2nd quarter, 27 points). The 95 points scored by the Jayhawks in 2006 and 2007 combined is the largest consecutive two-year total in the series.  Also, the 32 points scored in an overtime loss at Nebraska on September 30, 2006, was the most by any Jayhawk team in Lincoln since 1899, when KU won 36–20 in the two teams' eighth all-time meeting.  Former head coach Turner Gill is a former athlete and coach for the Cornhuskers, playing football and baseball during his college career and returning as an assistant football coach for 1989 and 1992–2004.

Team records and statistics

Records
 October 6, 1990: KU and rival Iowa State end their game in a 34–34 tie, giving KU the all-time NCAA Division I-A record for number of tie games with 58.  Since then, the NCAA has introduced the overtime period in football games. Only a rule change would allow this record to be broken.
 December 23, 2005: KU's strong rushing defense, led by Big 12 Defensive Player of the year Nick Reid, finishes the season by limiting Houston to just 30 rushing yards in the Fort Worth Bowl, a KU bowl record, bringing its season average down to 83.3 yards allowed per game and breaking the school record of 109.2 set in 1948.  It was the ninth time in the season the Jayhawks held their opponent to less than 100 yards on the ground. The Jayhawks held future NFL quarterback Kevin Kolb to 214 yards, 0 touchdowns and 3 interceptions. For the season, their defense ranked 3rd nationally against the rush.
 November 18, 2006: The Jayhawk defense's record setting 23 game streak without allowing a 100-yard rusher ends in a 39–20 victory over rival Kansas State when K-State runningback Leon Patton rushes for 102 yards.  The streak started following a 27–23 loss to Texas on November 13, 2004.
 November 25, 2006:  In the regular season finale, senior running back Jon Cornish ran for 126 yards in a 42–17 loss to Missouri to become KU's all-time single season leading rusher.  His 1,457 yards surpassed the previous record of 1,442 yards set by Tony Sands in 1991.
 November 17, 2007: Kansas defeated rival Iowa State 45–7, moving to 11–0 for the first time in school history.
 September 12, 2009: Kansas defeated UTEP 34–7, going to 20–2 in their last 22 nonconference games since 2005. It was the last road game Kansas won until September 8, 2018, marking a 46-game losing streak.

In the polls
The Jayhawks have finished ranked in the AP poll seven times, and appeared in the poll at some point in 18 different seasons. They have only been ranked in a preseason poll 6 times. In the 2007 season the Jayhawks achieved a No. 2 ranking in the AP poll and the BCS rankings, which is the highest the team has ever been ranked. The highest postseason ranking the Jayhawks have ever received was 7th for the 2007 season. In the final poll of the 2007 season, the Jayhawks received one 1st place vote. The Jayhawks were ranked in the poll released on October 2, 2022. It was the first time they had been ranked since October 18, 2009. Since its inception in 2014, the Jayhawks have yet to receive a single vote in the College Football Playoff rankings. The most consecutive weeks the Jayhawks have been ranked in the AP poll is 16 consecutive polls dating from October 7, 2007 through October 19, 2008. The most consecutive games the Jayhawks have been unranked is 175 spanning from October 23, 1976, to September 22, 1992.

AP Poll

BCS rankings (1998–2013)

Players of note

Innovators to the game
 Don 'Red Dog' Ettinger – Inventor of the blitz

First-Team AP All-Americans

 1947– Ray Evans, RB
 1947– Otto Schnellbacher, WR
 1951– George Mrkonic, G
 1952– Ollie Spencer, T
 1960– John Hadl, RB
 1961– John Hadl, QB
 1963– Gale Sayers, RB
 1964– Gale Sayers, RB
 1968– Bobby Douglass, QB
 1968– John Zook, DE
 1973– David Jaynes, QB
 2007– Anthony Collins, T
 2007– Aqib Talib, CB

Heisman voting

Ring of Honor members
The Ring of Honor is located atop the northern bowl at Memorial Stadium and is intended to honor Kansas All-Americans and others who have made a significant on-field contribution to the football program. They are listed in the order in which they were inducted.

Source:

Coaches in University of Kansas Athletics Hall of Fame
Former coaches for Kansas football are honored by being inducted into the Kansas Athletics Hall of Fame instead of the Ring of Honor. The following coaches are in the Kansas Hall of Fame.

Retired numbers

College Football Hall of Fame inductees

Pro Football Hall of Fame inductees

Canadian Football League Hall of Fame inductees

Former players notable in other fields

Naismith Memorial Basketball Hall of Famers
Two members of the Naismith Memorial Basketball Hall of Fame have been associated with Kansas football

Jayhawks in the pros

NFL
Players listed below are former Kansas football players on an NFL roster.

 Hakeem Adeniji, T, Cincinnati Bengals
 Dorance Armstrong, DE, Dallas Cowboys
 Chris Harris Jr., CB, New Orleans Saints
 Kyron Johnson, LB, Philadelphia Eagles
 Steven Sims, WR, Pittsburgh Steelers

XFL
 Pooka Williams Jr., RB, DC Defenders

USFL
 Bryce Torneden, S, Pittsburgh Maulers

Jayhawks as coaches
 A.J. Steward (WR, 2007–11), Baylor assistant head coach and running backs coach
 Kevin Kane (LB, 2002–05), Purdue assistant head coach and outside linebackers coach
 Darrin Simmons, (P, 1993–95), Cincinnati Bengals assistant head coach/special teams coordinator

Head coaches

The Jayhawks have had 38 official head coaches, while one unofficial player-coach, Will Coleman, coached the team in their first year of existence in 1890. The Jayhawks head coach since 2021 has been Lance Leipold. They have played in more than 1200 games in their 123 seasons. During that time, seven head coaches have led the Jayhawks to postseason bowl games: George Sauer, Jack Mitchell, Pepper Rodgers, Don Fambrough, Bud Moore, Glen Mason, and Mark Mangino. Six coaches have also won conference championships: A. W. Shepard, Hector Cowan, A. R. Kennedy, Homer Woodson "Bill" Hargiss, George Sauer, and Pepper Rodgers. Mason is the all-time leader in games coached at 101, while Mitchell and Mason are tied for the most years coached at nine. Kennedy is the leader in all-time wins at 52, and Wylie G. Woodruff leads in winning percentage among coaches who coached more than 1 year with a winning percentage of .833 with Kennedy just behind with a winning percentage of .831. As of the end of the 2017 season, David Beaty has the worst percentage among coaches who coached more than one season with a winning percentage of .083. Naismith Memorial Basketball Hall of Fame and long time Kansas men's basketball coach Phog Allen coached the Jayhawk football team in 1920. In his lone season as the football coach, the Jayhawks had a 5–2–1 record.

Of the 37 different head coaches who have led the Jayhawks, only Cowan,  and Yost have been inducted into the College Football Hall of Fame. Mark Mangino received 9 different coach of the year awards in 2007.

Future non-conference opponents
Future schedules are based on official announcements from Kansas and the schedule taken from future schedules on their website.

References

External links

 

 
American football teams established in 1890
1890 establishments in Kansas